Club Français was a French association football club based in Paris which was founded in 1890. Club Français won the 1896 USFSA Football Championship and Coupe de France Final 1931.

In 1900 the USFSA elected players from Club Français to represent France at the Summer Olympics. The team (wearing the USFSA representative uniform) won the silver medal after two matches played.

Club Francais was the first to be established by French-natives. It took part in all the competitions organised by the USFSA, gaining reputation as one of the most important clubs in the country between 1896 and 1904, where CF won a domestic league, one Dewar Cup and six Manier Cup.

In 1915, the club left USFSA to join Ligue de Football Association, winning a Challenge de la Renommée competition during the World War I. Affiliated to French Football Federation since 1919, Club Francais competed in the Paris Football League, winning two championships in 1929 and 1930 and a Coupe de France in 1931.

Club Francais became professional in 1932, competing in the first ever Ligue 1 season, but the team was relegated to Division 2 when the season concluded. Due to financial problems, the club abandoned the second division championship in 1934. Without a home venue, Club Francais merged with Dionysian Athletic Football Club based in Saint Denis. The new club renamed "Athletic Football Club Dionysian-Club", leaving also its traditional pink and black colors.

Honours 
 USFSA Championship (1): 1896
 Coupe de France (1): 1931
 Latin Capital Cup (Runner-up): 1929

References

Defunct football clubs in France
Association football clubs established in 1890
Association football clubs disestablished in 1935
Football clubs in Paris
1890 establishments in France
1935 disestablishments in France
Ligue 1 clubs